Thomas A. LaVeist is dean and Weatherhead Presidential Chair at the School of Public Health and Tropical Medicine at Tulane University in New Orleans, Louisiana. He was previously chairman of the Department of Health Policy and Management at the George Washington University, Milken Institute School of Public Health. He focuses mainly on the development of policy and interventions to address race disparities in the health field.

He has published more than 100 articles in scientific journals, including Health Affairs, Journal of General Internal Medicine, American Journal of Public Health, American Journal of Epidemiology, American Journal of Sociology, Milbank Quarterly, Medical Care, Journal of the American College of Cardiology, Ethnicity and Disease, Health Services Research, and Social Science & Medicine. His research has been funded by the National Institutes of Health, Center for Disease Control, Department of Defense, Commonwealth Fund, Sage Foundation and Agency for Healthcare Research.

Early life and education 
Thomas LaVeist was born and raised in the Brownsville section of Brooklyn, New York. 
He obtained his B.A. in Sociology from the University of Maryland Eastern Shore (UMES) in 1984. At UMES he was a member of the football team and Phi Beta Sigma fraternity. He received his M.A in sociology in 1985, and received his Ph.D. in medical sociology from the University of Michigan in 1988. He completed his postdoctoral fellowship in Gerontology and Public Health Policy & Administration University of Michigan School of Public Health in 1990. He received a certificate in 2004 from the Johns Hopkins University on Leadership Foundations, Leadership development training programs. LaVeist is also certified in Organizational Governance through the National Association of Corporate Directors.

During his time at the University of Michigan, he helped found the National Black Graduate Students Association, a student-run non-profit organization with the original goal to "provide an opportunity for African American graduate students to develop professionally as well as serve as a forum for future researchers and academic professionals." The program has grown significantly over the years in goals and in numbers from the University of Michigan to partner programs in schools across the United States.

Career
LaVeist joined the Johns Hopkins faculty in 1990 and served in various roles including chair of academic policy and admissions committee, professor of health policy and management since 2004, professor of sociology since 2004, holder of a joint appointment in the School of Medicine Oncology Department since 2005, faculty associate in the Sidney Kimmel Comprehensive Cancer Center since 2005, and faculty associate in the Hopkins Population Center since 1993. After 25 years of teaching health policy and being a chair of the Director of the Hopkins Center for Health Disparities at The Johns Hopkins University Bloomberg School of Public Health, he joined the George Washington University faculty as a professor and chair of the Department of Health Policy and Management.

Projects
"The Skin You're In" is LaVeist's current project. This is a movement based on bringing awareness to racism and inequity within the healthcare field for people of color. The project includes a documentary series that follows an average group of African American people in the United States, and shows their struggles within getting appropriate and proper care in the face of racism within the health care system. They address what the problems are, why they are happening, and how to fix it. 

LaVeist's project highlights key points like providing access to peer-reviewed research on health issues and health care disparities that are normally hidden behind paywalls, or school access; he acknowledges that not everyone has access to either of those things. He makes sure that the articles posted are peer-reviewed and factual. His project also highlights multiple myths about African Americans and their health as well as his source backing his answer.

Funding
LaVeist's work has been supported by grants from the National Institutes of Health, Centers for Disease Control and Prevention, Department of Defense, Commonwealth Fund, the Russell Sage Foundation, and Agency for Healthcare Research and Quality.

Honors and awards 
He has earned awards such as the Knowledge Award from the US Department of Health and Human Services and the American Sociology Association's Roberta G. Simmons best Dissertation Award. In 2013, he was elected to the National Academy of Medicine (formerly Institute of Medicine).

Works 
 2000, The DayStar Guide to Colleges for African American Students. Simon & Schuster/Stanly Kaplan Publishing.
 2003, Eight Steps to Help Black Families Pay for College.  Princeton Review
 2005, Minority Populations and Health: An Introduction to Health Disparities in the United States. Jossey-Bass.
 2012, Race, Ethnicity and Health: A Public Health Reader. Jossey-Bass
 2017, Legacy of the Crossing: Life death and triumph among descendants of the world's greatest forced migration. Diasporic Africa Press

References

Year of birth missing (living people)
20th-century African-American academics
20th-century American academics
21st-century African-American academics
21st-century American academics
20th-century African-American scientists
21st-century African-American scientists
African-American academic administrators
African-American male writers
American sociologists
George Washington University faculty
Johns Hopkins Bloomberg School of Public Health alumni
Johns Hopkins Bloomberg School of Public Health faculty
Living people
Medical sociologists
Members of the National Academy of Medicine
Tulane University faculty
University of Michigan School of Public Health alumni